William C. Varner is an American biblical scholar. He is Professor of Biblical Studies & Greek at The Master's University. 

Varner studied at Bob Jones University, Dropsie College, Biblical Theological Seminary, Gratz College, and Temple University.

He and his wife, Helen, have two grown children and one with the Lord plus four beautiful grandchildren. He grew up in South Carolina in a non-Christian home and came to the Lord at the age of 17. He attended Bob Jones University and then graduated from the Biblical Theological Seminary in 1972. Will was a pastor in Pennsylvania for seven happy years, and during that time earned another Masters degree in NT and experienced his first trip to Israel – an experience that would leave an indelible mark on his ministry. He then served for 17 years with The Friends of Israel Gospel Ministry in New Jersey while earning a third masters degree in Jewish Studies at Dropsie College and then a doctorate at Temple University in Philadelphia.

In 1996, he came to The Master’s College, where he teaches Bible exposition courses and Greek Exegesis. He was also the Director of IBEX, the college’s overseas campus in Israel, for over twenty years, and has led 51 study trips to the land of Israel. Will pastored the Sojourners fellowship in Grace Community Church for twenty three years, and now teaches the Bereans Class at Grace Baptist Church.  He has written twenty books, some for laymen and some for scholars. His most significant scholarly efforts have been the 450 page commentary on James published by Fontes Press and a new translation and introduction to the Apostolic Fathers published by T&T Clark. 

In 2021, a Festschrift was published in his honor: Written for Our Instruction: Essays in Honor of William Varner.

BOOKS

1.The Chariot of Israel: Exploits of the Prophet Elijah, 1984, 184 pp.

2. Jacob's Dozen: The Tribes of Israel in History and Prophecy, 1987, 120 pp.

3.  How Jewish is Christianity?, Zondervan, 2003.

4. The Messiah: Revealed, Rejected, Received, AuthorHouse, 2004, 290 pp.

5. Ancient Jewish-Christian Dialogues: Athanasius and Zacchaeus, Simon and Theophilus, Timothy and Aquila Edwin Mellen Press, 2005.

6. The Way of the Didache: The First Christian Handbook, University Press of America, 2007.

7.  A Discourse Analysis of the Letter of James, 2011, 2017.

8.  Awake O Harp: Devotional Commentary on Psalms, 2012, 2017.

9.  James: A Devotional Commentary, Kindle Publishing, 2017.

10.  James: A Commentary on the Greek Text, Fontes Press, 2017.

11. Philippians: An Exegetical Commentary, Fontes Press, 2021.

12. To Preach or Not to Preach: Women’s Ministry Then and Now, Kindle Publishing, 2018.

13. Commentary on 2 Clement, Wipf and Stock, 2020

14. Passionate About the Passion Week, Fontes Press, 2020.

15. Anticipating the Advent, Fontes Press, 2020

16. Messiah’s Ministry, Fontes Press, 2021

17. Co-author of Big Greek Idea commentary on James, Kregel 2022

18. Handbook on Praying Scripture from the Legacy Standard Bible, 316 Publishers, 2023

19. The Preacher and the Song, Fontes Press, 2023

20. The Apostolic Fathers: An Introduction and Translation, T&T Clark, 2023.

Contributed to six other books, two with Wipf and Stock, two with Brill, one with Kregel

References

Living people
American biblical scholars
Bob Jones University alumni
Dropsie College alumni
Year of birth missing (living people)